Gabisile Hlumbane is a South African women's footballer and plays as a midfielder. She plays for Kovsies Ladies. She represented the South Africa women's national football team at the 2012 London Olympics.

Early career
Hlumbane was born in KwaThema, Gauteng. She started playing soccer at the age of 11 for KwaThema Ladies. Her father bought soccer boots and watched her play regularly while her mother didn't like the fact that she played soccer.

Club career
She joined Kovsies Ladies in 2005 after being named the Gauteng Schools Sports Girl of the Year in 2004 for scoring 8 goals in a tournament. She was recruited by the chairwoman of women's football, Nomsa Mahlangu. At the University of Free State she studied municipal financial management, she was also the captain and teammate of the late Eudy Simelane who nicknamed her China for her small eyes. In 2011, she was named the University of Free State Sportswoman of the Year, the first black person to achieve the feat and was also nominated for Free State Sportswoman of the Year.

References

1986 births
Living people
People from KwaThema
Women's association football midfielders
South African women's soccer players
South Africa women's international soccer players
Footballers at the 2012 Summer Olympics
Olympic soccer players of South Africa
Sportspeople from Gauteng